The first season of the American television comedy-drama series Devious Maids began airing on Lifetime on June 23, 2013. The season consisted of 13 episodes, and concluded on September 22, 2013, with a season high of nearly 3 million viewers. The pilot episode has received positive reviews from critics. It tells the story of five Latina women who works as maids in Beverly Hills, and how they are affected when one of their friends, Flora, is murdered for knowing a secret. Marisol Suarez (Ana Ortiz), tries to figure out who was the killer in order to help her son get released from prison. 

On August 13, 2013, Devious Maids was renewed for a second season, consisting of 13 episodes.

Plot
The show opens with the murder of maid Flora Hernandez (Paula Garces) on a summer night of June 2013, and a man by the name of Eddie Suarez (Eddie Hassell) is arrested for the crime, which he allegedly did not commit. His mother, Marisol (Ana Ortiz) takes a job as a local Beverly Hills maid for Taylor (Brianna Brown) and Michael Stappord (Brett Cullen) in order to befriend three other local maids that were once friends with Flora. These include Rosie Falta (Dania Ramirez), a sweet and kindhearted maid who works for movie actors Peri (Mariana Klaveno) and Spence Westmore (Grant Show), and ends up having an affair with the latter; Carmen Luna (Roselyn Sanchez), an aspiring singer who works for Latino popstar Alejandro Rubio (Matt Cedeño), and eventually falls for her co-worker, Sam Alexander (Wolé Parks); and Zoila Diaz (Judy Reyes), longtime housekeeper for Genevieve Delatour (Susan Lucci). Zoila's daughter, Valentina Diaz (Edy Ganem), also stars; a 19-year-old wannabe fashion designer who has the 'hots' for Genevieve's son, Remi (Drew Van Acker). The season wraps up with Marisol discovering who killed Flora, and her son getting out of jail; Peri finds out about Rosie and Spence's affair and gets revenge by calling immigration; Carmen agrees to marry Alejandro in order to make the press believe he is not a homosexual, but this leads to the end of her romance with Sam; and Zoila has to wish her daughter a farewell as Valentina flies to Africa to be with Remi for the next year.

Cast and characters
The show features an ensemble cast with female leads. Ana Ortiz, Dania Ramirez, Roselyn Sánchez, Judy Reyes and Edy Ganem play the lead roles where they are maids. Susan Lucci, Rebecca Wisocky, Brianna Brown, Mariana Klaveno, Tom Irwin, Brett Cullen and Grant Show plays the maids bosses and are rich Beverly Hills socialites. Drew Van Acker and Wolé Parks also had regular roles in the season. Several actors also appeared on a recurring basis in season one, including Emmy Award–winner Valerie Mahaffey as Olivia Rice, Stephen Collins as Philippe Delatour, Matt Cedeño as Alejandro Rubio, Melinda Page Hamilton as Odessa Burakov, Maria Howell as Ida Hayes, Alex Fernandez as Pablo Diaz, and Paula Garcés as Flora Hernandez.

Casting
Dania Ramirez was the first lead cast member to be cast as Rosie, on February 15. Ana Ortiz joined the cast as the central character two days later on February 17. On February 23, both Sanchez and Judy Reyes were added to the cast as Carmen and Zoila respectively. When Edy Ganem was announced in the cast on March 2, the show was still described as centering on the other four maids (Ortiz, Reyes, Sanchez, and Ramirez).

After the pilot episode was picked to series by Lifetime, Wolé Parks was added to the cast in a regular role on November 21. Melinda Page Hamilton and Matt Cedeño were added to the cast in recurring roles with the promise of promotion if the show got picked up for a second season on November 26. Valerie Mahaffey also made cameo in pilot, and later had recurring role as Olivia Rice. Several actors from Desperate Housewives had roles in Devious Maids. Richard Burgi, Andrea Parker, Jolie Jenkins, Patrika Darbo, Dakin Matthews, and Liz Torres, who previously appeared in Desperate Housewives, have guest roles in the season.

Cast

Main
 Ana Ortiz as Marisol Duarte/Suarez 
 Dania Ramirez as Rosie Falta 
 Roselyn Sánchez as Carmen Luna 
 Judy Reyes as Zoila Diaz 
 Edy Ganem as Valentina Diaz
 Rebecca Wisocky as Evelyn Powell 
 Tom Irwin as Adrian Powell 
 Grant Show as Spencer Westmore 
 Drew Van Acker as Remi Delatour 
 Susan Lucci as Genevieve Delatour 
 Mariana Klaveno as Peri Westmore 
 Brianna Brown as Taylor Stappord 
 Brett Cullen as Michael Stappord 
 Wolé Parks as Sam Alexander

Recurring
 Matt Cedeño as Alejandro Rubio 
 Maria Howell as Ida Hayes 
 Melinda Page Hamilton as Odessa Burakov
 Paula Garcés as Flora Hernandez 
 Stephen Collins as Phillipe Delatour 
 Valerie Mahaffey as Olivia Rice 
Eddie Hassell as Eddie Suarez

Guest
 Alex Fernandez as Pablo Diaz 
 Octavio Westwood as Miguel Falta
 Damon Sementilli as Cody
 Dakin Matthews as Alfred Pettigrove
 Peter Porte as Scott
 Carlos Leal as Benny Soto

Episodes

Broadcasting
The first season aired on Lifetime, Sundays at 10:00 pm. The show was originally in development to air on ABC. however it was not picked up by the studio. Lifetime then picked up the pilot with a thirteen-order run. The pilot episode was released online on June 9, 2013, before its television debut.

The pilot drew 1.99 million viewers, and in episode six, shot up 45 percent from the series premiere, to 2.90 million viewers. The first-season finale was the highest-rated episode of the season, peaking at 3 million viewers.

Ratings

U.S. ratings

References

External links
 Official website 
 
 
 Devious Maids at Rotten Tomatoes

Devious Maids
2013 American television seasons